Jerry Wampfler (born August 6, 1932) is a former American football player and coach.  He served as the head football coach at Colorado State University from 1970 to 1972, compiling a record of 8–25.  Prior to being hired at Colorado State, Wampfler was an assistant football coach at the University of Notre Dame under Ara Parseghian. 

Wampfler was hired in January 1970 by Colorado State on a four-year contract after he turned down a three-year offer. He promised that he could turn the struggling program around in four years, but his teams went 4–7 and 3–8 in the next two seasons, failing to win more than one conference game each time. Following a 1–10 performance in the 1972 season, alumni and students disappointed with the state of the football program called for the firing of either Wampfler or athletic director Perry Moore in December 1972. After these events resulted in the decision to retain both men, Moore challenged Wampfler to commit to remaining with Colorado State or to resign. Wampfler resigned from his position in early February 1973, citing a lack of confidence in the administration's commitment to the football program.

Head coaching record

College

References

1932 births
Living people
Colorado State Rams football coaches
Miami RedHawks football coaches
Miami RedHawks football players
Notre Dame Fighting Irish football coaches
Presbyterian Blue Hose football coaches
Buffalo Bills coaches
Detroit Lions coaches
Green Bay Packers coaches
New York Giants coaches
Philadelphia Eagles coaches
San Diego Chargers coaches
High school football coaches in Ohio
People from New Philadelphia, Ohio
Players of American football from Ohio